= Fulham Court Estate =

Housing estate in Fulham, London, England

Fulham Court Estate is an estate in the Fulham district of London, England. Nonethless, the estate is a mix of social and private home owners. Situated very close to Parsons Green Tube station and Fulham Broadway tube station.

Fulham Court Estate consists of a number of four-storey blocks built in the 1930s.
